Suldan (also Romanized as Sūldān and Sūldan; also known as Sūlān) is a village in Bahu Kalat Rural District, Dashtiari District, Chabahar County, Sistan and Baluchestan Province, Iran. At the 2006 census, its population was 674, in 124 families.

References 

Populated places in Chabahar County